The term Vulcan Hotel can refer to:

The Vulcan, Cardiff
The Vulcan Hotel (Saint Bathans), located in Saint Bathans, New Zealand